Alviniconcha is a genus of deep water sea snails, marine gastropod mollusks in the family Provannidae. These snails are part of the fauna of the hydrothermal vents in the Indian and Western Pacific Ocean. These and another genus and species within the same family (Ifremeria nautilei) are the only known currently existing animals whose nutrition is derived from an endosymbiotic relationship with a member of bacteria from phylum Campylobacterota (formerly Epsilonproteobacteria) occurs as an endosymbiont of the gills of Alviniconcha hessleri.

Description
The size of the shell varies between 25 mm and 35 mm. The surface of the shell is studded with hairs on the periostracum, Individuals variation in shell size and the arrangement of the hairs, but the variation does not correspond to individual species.

Species
Until 2014, Alviniconcha consisted solely of the species Alviniconcha hessleri, described in 1988. In 2014, increased recognition of genetic differences between populations resulted in the formal description of five cryptic species within the former A. hessleri that are morphologically indistinguishable from each other but that have consistent differences in mitochondrial DNA sequences.

Species within the genus Alviniconcha include:
 Alviniconcha adamantis S.B. Johnson, Warén, Tunnicliffe, Van Dover, Wheat, Schultz & Vrijenhoek, 2014
 Alviniconcha boucheti S.B. Johnson, Warén, Tunnicliffe, Van Dover, Wheat, Schultz & Vrijenhoek, 2014
 Alviniconcha hessleri  Okutani & Ohta, 1988
 Alviniconcha kojimai S.B. Johnson, Warén, Tunnicliffe, Van Dover, Wheat, Schultz & Vrijenhoek, 2014
 Alviniconcha marisindica Okutani, 2014
 Alviniconcha strummeri S.B. Johnson, Warén, Tunnicliffe, Van Dover, Wheat, Schultz & Vrijenhoek, 2014 (named after punk musician Joe Strummer of The Clash)

References

 Healy, J.M. 1992, Dimorphic spermatozoa of the hydrothermal vent prosobranch Alviniconcha  hessleri: systematic importance and  comparison with other caenogastropods; Bull. Mus. Natl. His. Nat. Paris  4 sér A 14: 273-291
 Desbruyères, D., M. Segonzac & M. Bright (eds.). 2006. Handbook of Deep-sea Hydrothermal Vent Fauna. Second Edition Denisia 18:1-544. (Copepods 316-355)(Polychaeta 183-296)

External links 
 

Provannidae